Vanessa Ann Zamarripa (born August 1, 1990, in Redlands, California) is an American stunt actress and former artistic gymnast. She trained at Midwest Twisters in O’Fallon, IL. Zamarripa won a record 3 JO National AA Titles (2003, 2004, 2007) and a record 3 Vault Titles.  She was a member of the UCLA Bruins women's gymnastics team that won the 2010 NCAA National Championship title. She also won an individual NCAA title on vault, total of 19 All-American honors, and became a national team member in 2010 while competing in the NCAA for the UCLA Bruins.

Career

Junior career
Zamarripa trained at Midwest Twisters in O'Fallon, IL under coaches Mickey Orr, M.S. and Jenny Hayden. She was one of the most accomplished gymnasts in Junior Olympic history, winning nine Level 10 individual national titles from 2003 to 2007 including national records for winning 3 JO Vault titles (back-to-back-to-back) and 3 JO All-Around titles.  Her gold medal vault in 2004 was a then JO national record (9.825). She missed a 4th AA Gold in 2005 taking the Silver AA instead. In 2004 she also competed as a Pre-Elite winning V, BB, and AA against some notable Olympic hopefuls including Ivana Hong and Shantessa Pama.

NCAA career
Zamarripa was one of the most successful gymnasts of the UCLA Bruins. She was the 2010 NCAA Vault Champion and a member of the UCLA Bruins women's gymnastics team that won the 2010 NCAA National Championship title. She scored nine perfect 10 on vault in her NCAA career and was a school-record 19-time All-American. During her senior season in 2013, she was the NACGC/W Division I National Gymnast of the Year and AAI Award winner (awarded to the nation's top collegiate senior gymnast). She was also the West Region Gymnast of the Year and Pac-12 Gymnast of the Year for the second time in her career.

Career Perfect 10.0

Elite career
Zamarripa was a member of the US national team in 2010. In July 2010, she competed in her first elite meet at the CoverGirl Classics. She placed 5th on the uneven bars, 6th on vault and 7th in the all-around. Later in August, she competed at the US national championships. She became one of the very few gymnast in the world to successfully perform a Cheng vault (round-off flic-flac with ½ turn on – stretched salto forward with 1½ turn off, named after the Chinese gymnast Cheng Fei). She won silver on vault, was 7th on the uneven bars and 8th in the all-around.

References

External links
 Vanessa Zamarripa on Instagram
 Vanessa Zamarripa on IMDb

1990 births
Living people
American female artistic gymnasts
UCLA Bruins women's gymnasts
People from Redlands, California
U.S. women's national team gymnasts
NCAA gymnasts who have scored a perfect 10